

Small arms

Rifles 

 Mauser Model 1903
 Gewehr 88/05
 Mauser Gewehr 98
 Mauser Model 1887 Turkish Mauser M1871/84 version
 Ottoman-Mauser Model 1890 Turkish Mauser M1889 version 
 Mauser Model 1893
 Mauser M1903
 Mauser M1905 and Mauser M1908
 Mauser Karabiner 98k
 vz. 24
 vz. 98/22
 Mosin-Nagant M1891/30
 Berthier M1916
 M1 Carbine
 M1 Garand

Sidearms 

 Beholla M1915
 Browning FN M1903
 Browning FN M1910 & FN M1922
 CZ vz. 27
 Frommer M1912 Stop
 Luger P08
 Mauser C96
 Walther PP
 Smith & Wesson No. 3

Submachine guns 

 Bergmann MP18/I
 Sten

Light machine guns 

 Bergmann MG15nA
 MG 08/15
 MG 34
 ZB vz. 26

Machine guns 
 Hotchkiss Mle 1914 machine gun
 Schwazlose M1907/12
 DWM MG08 
 Maxim
 Vickers
 PM M1910

Armoured fighting vehicles(AFV's)

Tanks 

 T-26- Soviet AFV's bought before World War II in 1930s
 T-27
 T-28
 Panzer III- Both Axis and western Allies in 1943 gifted tanks to Turkey to try to get them to join their side. 
 Panzer IV
 Valentine tank
 M4 Sherman

Light tanks 

 M3 Stuart

Armoured cars 

 BA-6

Armoured personnel carriers (apcs) 

 Universal Carrier

See also
List of aircraft of Turkey during World War II

References

World War II military equipment of Turkey
Turkish military-related lists